Romulus, My Father is a 2007 Australian drama film directed by Richard Roxburgh. Based on the memoir by Raimond Gaita, the film tells the story of Romulus (Eric Bana) and his wife Christine (Franka Potente), and their struggle in the face of great adversity to raise their son, Raimond (Kodi Smit-McPhee). The film marks the directorial debut for Australian actor Richard Roxburgh. It was commended in the Australian Film Critics Association 2007 Film Awards.

Plot

The film tells the story of Romulus Gaiţă, a Romanian immigrant to Australia after World War II and his struggle in the face of great adversity to bring up his son, Raimond. As close family members die around him Raimond has to deal with the deterioration of his father's mental health. It is a story of impossible love that ultimately celebrates the unbreakable bond between father and son.

Cast
 Eric Bana as Romulus, the father of Raimond.
 Kodi Smit-McPhee as Raimond, the son of Romulus and Christine.
 Franka Potente as Christine, the mother of Raimond and the former wife of Romulus.
 Marton Csokas as Hora, a friend of Romulus. Hora becomes a temporary father figure to a young Raimond Gaita while his father is in a psychiatric hospital.
 Russell Dykstra as Mitru
 Jacek Koman as Vacek
 Alethea McGrath as Mrs Lillie
 Terry Norris as Tom Lillie
 Esme Melville as Miss Collard

Locations
 Ballarat, Victoria, Australia
 Bendigo, Victoria, Australia
 Carisbrook, Victoria, Australia
 Castlemaine, Victoria, Australia
 Maldon, Victoria, Australia
 Maryborough, Victoria, Australia

Soundtrack
 "Real Wild Child" (Johnny O'Keefe, Dave Owens, John Greenan) — Jerry Lee Lewis
 "My Prayer" —  The Platters

Awards
 Winner Golden Tripod Award, Australian Cinematographers Society—2007
 Winner AFI Award for Best Film, Best Lead Actor (Eric Bana), Best Supporting Actor (Marton Csokas), and Young Actor's Award (Kodi Smit-McPhee) – 2007
 Nominated AFI Award for Best Cinematography (Geoffrey Simpson), Best Costume Design, Best Direction, Best Editing, Best Lead Actor (Kodi Smit-McPhee), Best Lead Actress (Franka Potente), Best Original Music Score, Best Production Design, Best Screenplay, Best Sound, Best Supporting Actor (Russell Dykstra), Best Supporting Actress (Esme Melville) – 2007
 Won Australian Screen Sound Guild Award for Best Achievement in Sound for Film Sound Recording—2007
 Nominated Australian Screen Sound Guild Award for Best Achievement in Sound for Film Sound Design, Best Achievement in Sound for Film Sound Mixing, Feature Film Soundtrack of the Year—2007
 Won FCCA Award for Best Actor in Supporting Role (Marton Csokas) – 2008
 Won Special Achievement Award, FCAA to Kodi Smit-McPhee—2008
 Nominated FCAA Award for Best Actor (Eric Bana), Best Actor in Supporting Role (Kodi Smit-McPhee), Best Cinematography, Best Director, Best Editing, Best Film, Best Music Score—2008
 Nominated Young Artist Awards, Best Performance in an International Feature Film (Kodi Smit-McPhee)

Box office
Romulus, My Father grossed $2,589,674 at the box office in Australia.

See also
Cinema of Australia

References

External links
 
 
 Romulus My Father at Oz Movies 
 
Romulus, My Father at the National Film and Sound Archive
 Interview with the cast at the Australian movie premiere on WHO.com

2007 films
Australian biographical drama films
Australian coming-of-age drama films
2007 biographical drama films
Films based on works by Australian writers
Films directed by Richard Roxburgh
Films about psychiatry
Films about suicide
Films set in 1962
Films shot in Melbourne
Films set in Victoria (Australia)
2007 directorial debut films
2007 drama films
Films about father–son relationships
Films about families
2000s English-language films